John Belcher may refer to:

John Belcher (politician) (1905–1964), British Labour Party Member of Parliament 1945–1949
John Belcher (architect) (1841–1913), English architect and writer
John E. Belcher, Irish-born Canadian civil engineer and architect
John Belcher (Methodist preacher) ( 1721–1763), Welsh Methodist preacher
John Winston Belcher (born 1943), American physicist